Polyptychus aurora is a moth of the  family Sphingidae. It is known from the Democratic Republic of the Congo, Zambia and Malawi.

References

Polyptychus
Moths described in 1936
Insects of the Democratic Republic of the Congo
Insects of Tanzania
Moths of Africa